Todi Adam Jónsson (born 2 February 1972) is a Faroese former professional footballer who played as a striker for Danish premier league clubs Lyngby FC and FC Copenhagen, Norwegian club Start and Danish club Fremad Amager. He started and ended his football career at Faroese side KÍ Klaksvík.

He has played 45 matches for Faroe Islands national football team and is currently (2018) number two on the top goal scorer's list with 9 goals. Jónsson is the highest scoring foreign football player in the Danish Superliga (Premier League) with 72 goals. He was previously the all-time top scorer for FC København together with Lars Højer Nielsen, they both scored 54 goals for FCK, but they have later been surpassed by Cesar Santin and Dame N'Doye.

Club career 
Jónsson spent a large portion of his career at the Danish Superliga side FC Copenhagen, having arrived in 1997 from Lyngby BK together with the new CEO Flemming Østergaard. Todi, as he is known by the FC Copenhagen fans, is one of the all-time leading goal scorers for the club and a member of the Hall of Fame as decided by fan club voting. From 1997 to 2005 he played 207 matches for FC Copenhagen and scored 68 goals.

On 25 June 2009, it was announced that Jónsson had rejoined KÍ Klaksvík, who, however, were unable to maintain their place in the Faroese top division. He ended his football career with the club where he started. He played his last match for KÍ Klaksvík on 3 October 2009 against EB/Streymur.

International career
In the Faroe Islands, Jónsson is arguably the most successful football player of all time, having played at an internationally high level for the better part of a decade with the Danish Champions FC Copenhagen. Furthermore, Todi was the most successful goalscorer for the Faroe Islands national football team with 9 goals in 45 caps, until Rógvi Jacobsen scored his 9th goal against Lithuania in September 2007, then fully overtaking Todi's record away to Italy two months later. Todi is also the only Faroese player to score a hat-trick in an international match. (Bergur Magnussen scored 6 times in the match against the Åland Islands back in 1989, but this match is not officially recognised.)

Todi is remembered for his premature and controversial international retirement in the spring of 2001, as he decided to concentrate fully on his club career. After that he won only two more caps, both in 2005.

Career statistics
Scores and results list Faroe Islands' goal tally first, score column indicates score after each Jónsson goal.

Honours 
KÍ Klaksvík
Faroe Islands Premier League: 1991

FC Copenhagen
Danish Superliga: 2000–01, 2002–03, 2003–04
Danish Cup: 2003–04
Danish Super Cup: 2001, 2004

References

External links 
 Todi Jónsson's profile on FaroeSoccer.com
 

1972 births
Living people
F.C. Copenhagen players
Faroese footballers
Faroe Islands international footballers
Faroese expatriate footballers
Expatriate footballers in Norway
Eliteserien players
Danish Superliga players
IF Lyseng Fodbold players
IK Start players
Lyngby Boldklub players
KÍ Klaksvík players
B36 Tórshavn players
Association football forwards
People from Vejle Municipality
Sportspeople from the Region of Southern Denmark